Raghupathy, Raghupati or Raghupathi (Telugu: రఘుపతి) is one of the Indian names.

 Raghupathi Venkaiah, was a pioneer in the Indian film industry .
 Raghupathi Venkaiah Award, is an annual award introduced to recognize people for their lifetime achievements in the Telugu film industry.
 Raghupathi Venkataratnam Naidu, was social reformer in India.
 Raghupathi Raghavan Rajaram, is a Tamil film is directed by Durai. 
 K.Raghupathi Bhat 
 Raghupathi Raghava Rajaram
 Raghupathy Dixit
Raghupati SaiPrakash